Tilia × europaea, generally known as the European lime, common lime (British Isles) or common linden, is a naturally occurring hybrid between Tilia cordata (small-leaved lime) and Tilia platyphyllos (large-leaved lime). It occurs in the wild in Europe at scattered localities wherever the two parent species are both native. It is not closely related to the lime fruit tree, a species of citrus.

Description

The base of the trunk often features burrs and a dense mass of brushwood. The flowers are produced in clusters of four to ten in early summer with a leafy yellow-green subtending bract; they are fragrant, and pollinated by bees. The floral formula is ✶ K5 C5 A0+5∞ (5). The fruit is a dry nut-like drupe  in diameter, downy and faintly ribbed.

Cultivation

This hybrid is very widely cultivated, being readily and inexpensively propagated by layering; as a result, it is often the commonest Tilia species in urban areas and along avenues and streets. It is not however the best species for this purpose, as it produces abundant stem sprouts, and also often hosts heavy aphid populations resulting in honeydew deposits on everything underneath the trees. Furthermore there is substantial leaf litter in autumn (fall).

Notable trees
One long-lived example was the "Malmvik lime", planted as a sapling near the Malmvik Manor in Stockholm, Sweden in 1618. The tree existed for 381 years until the last part of the tree fell in a storm in 1999. The tree in front of Augustusburg Hunting Lodge in Saxony was planted in 1421 according to the chronicles of Augustusburg.
Some 13 limes were planted at Mullary cemetery Co Louth Ireland to commemorate "king Billy's" victory at the battle of the Boyne in circa 1669 as lime are not native to Ireland and they were planted to mark the foreign victory, they remain standing today.

Uses
The leaves, except for their stalks, can be eaten raw.

The wood of the lime was commonly used by Vikings in their shields.Archaeologist Neil Price talked about this in a Wired video but I haven't found it in one of his books.

References

External links
 
Photos, measurements and location details of ancient common lime trees

europaea
Hybrid plants
Flora of Europe
Taxa named by Carl Linnaeus